Abilene may refer to:

Places

United States 
 Abilene, Kansas
 Abilene, Texas
 Abilene, Texas metropolitan area
 Abilene, Virginia
 Abilene State Park, near Abilene, Texas
 Abilene Trail, from Texas to Abilene, Kansas, used in the 19th century

Elsewhere
 Abilene (biblical), a plain in Syria on the eastern slope of Anti-Lebanon mountain range
 Abilene, Alberta, Canada

Films
 Abilene Town, a 1946 western film starring Randolph Scott
 Gunfighters of Abilene, a 1960 film starring Buster Crabbe
 Gunfight in Abilene, a 1967 western film starring Bobby Darin and Leslie Nielsen
 Abilene (film), a 1999 drama film starring Ernest Borgnine

Military
 Operation Abilene (1966), a joint US-Australian military operation in 1966 during the Vietnam War
 Operation Abilene (2003), a US military operation in Al Anbar province in 2003 during the Iraq War
 USS Abilene (PF-58), a 1943 Tacoma-class US navy frigate named after Abilene, Kansas
 Abilene Trophy,  awarded annually to the community in Air Mobility Command

Other uses
 Abilene Christian University. Abiline, Texas
 Abilene Network, the American national academic backbone network
 Abilene paradox, a form of dysfunctional group dynamics
 "Abilene" (song), a 1963 song recorded by George Hamilton IV
 Abilene and Smoky Valley Railroad, in Abilene, Kansas
 Abilene and Southern Railway, taken over by  Missouri Pacific Railroad in 1978